Heterophyidae is a family of intestinal trematodes in the order Plagiorchiida.

Description: "Tegument covered by spines. Oral sucker not armed or armed by cyrcumoral spines. Pharynx presented. Genital synus presented. Ventral and genital suckers usually not combined. Cirrus and bursa absent. Two testes located in posterior part of the body. Vitellaria in posterior part of the body."

First intermediate hosts are molluscs of Prosobranchia, second intermediate hosts are fishes. Definite hosts are birds and mammals, including humans.

Genera
Acanthotrema Travassos, 1928
Alloheterophyes Pearson, 1999
Apophallus Lühe, 1909
Ascocotyle Looss, 1899
Centrocestus Looss, 1899
Cercarioides Witenberg, 1929
Condylocotyla Pearson & Prevot, 1985
Cryptocotyle Lühe, 1899
Dermocystis Stafford, 1905
Galactosomum Looss, 1899
Haplorchis Looss, 1899
Haplorchoides Chen, 1949
Heterophyes Cobbold, 1866
Heterophyopsis Tubangui & Africa, 1938
Heterotestophyes Leonov, 1957
Irinaia Caballero & Bravo-Hollis, 1966
Metagonimus Katsurada, 1912
Neostictodora Sogandares-Bernal, 1959
Opisthometra Poche, 1926
Pandiontrema Oshmarin, 1963
Phocitrema Goto & Ozaki, 1930
Phocitremoides Martin, 1950
Pholeter Odhner, 1915
Procerovum Onji & Nishio, 1916
Protoheterophyes Pearson, 2002
Pseudogalactosoma Yamaguti, 1942
Pseudopygidiopsis Yamaguti, 1971
Pygidiopsis Looss, 1907
Pygidiopsoides Martin, 1951
Scaphanocephalus Jägerskiöld, 1903
Sonkulitrema Ablasov & Chibichenko, 1960
Stellantchasmus Onji & Nishio, 1916
Stictodora Looss, 1899
Taphrogonymus Cohn, 1904
Tetracladium Kulachkova, 1954

References

External links

 http://www.biology-online.org/dictionary/Heterophyidae
 https://web.archive.org/web/20110817025534/http://gelmintu.ru/klassy-rody-i-semejstva-gelmintov/semejstvo-heterophyidae-odhner-1914.html

 
Trematode families